Pyt-Yakh is a town in Khanty–Mansi Autonomous Okrug, Russia, located on the east bank of the Bolshoy Balyk River, southeast of Khanty-Mansiysk. Population:

History
The town was formed by merging the settlements of Mamontovo and Pyt-Yakh in 1990. The name of the town means "place of good people" in the Khanty language.

Administrative and municipal status
Within the framework of administrative divisions, it is incorporated as the town of okrug significance of Pyt-Yakh—an administrative unit with the status equal to that of the districts. As a municipal division, the town of okrug significance of Pyt-Yakh is incorporated as Pyt-Yakh Urban Okrug.

Economy
The town's economy is based on oil and natural gas extraction.

References

Notes

Sources

Cities and towns in Khanty-Mansi Autonomous Okrug